Three or Four Shades of Blues is a studio album by the American jazz bassist and bandleader Charles Mingus. It was recorded in sessions held on March 9 and 11, 1977, at New York City's Atlantic Studios, and on March 29 at the Record Plant in Los Angeles. The album features two new versions of Mingus's "standards" and three new compositions performed by large ensembles featuring saxophonists Ricky Ford, George Coleman, and Sonny Fortune, pianist Jimmy Rowles, guitarists Larry Coryell, Philip Catherine and John Scofield, bassists Ron Carter and George Mraz, trumpeter Jack Walrath, and drummer Dannie Richmond.

Critical reception 

In a contemporary review for The Village Voice, Robert Christgau said the second side on Three or Four Shades of Blue was "the best composed bebop" he had heard in 1977, partly because Coryell and Fortune gave their most impressive performances in some time. The New Yorker found the record "subtle and funny and full of Mingus's peculiar and unmistakable authority". AllMusic's Stuart Kremsky was less enthusiastic in a retrospective review, writing that it was not Mingus's "best work, but not without merit". He felt the title track was one of his most successful attempts at longer compositions, even though he said the electric guitars were out of place.

Track listing
All compositions by Charles Mingus.

Personnel
Charles Mingus: double bass, piano, vocals, arranger
Jack Walrath: trumpet
Ricky Ford: tenor saxophone
George Coleman: alto saxophone, tenor saxophone (tracks 1–4)
Sonny Fortune: alto saxophone (track 5)
Bob Neloms: piano
Jimmy Rowles: piano (track 4)
Philip Catherine: guitar (tracks 1–3 & 5)
Larry Coryell: guitar (tracks 1–4)
John Scofield: guitar (tracks 4 & 5)
Ron Carter: bass (track 5)
George Mraz: bass (tracks 1–3)
Dannie Richmond: drums
Paul Jeffrey: arranger

References

External links 
 

1977 albums
Atlantic Records albums
Charles Mingus albums
Albums arranged by Paul Jeffrey